The Younger Generation is a comedy play by the British writer Stanley Houghton. It takes place in a dining room of a house in the suburbs of Manchester, during a period of twenty four hours.

It premiered at the Gaiety Theatre, Manchester in 1910. It enjoyed a West End run of 131 performances between 19 November 1912 and 8 March 1913, originally at the Haymarket before transferring to the Duke of York's Theatre. The London cast included Nigel Playfair, Norman Page, Allan Jeayes and Kate Bateman.

References

Bibliography
 Wearing, J.P. The London Stage 1910-1919: A Calendar of Productions, Performers, and Personnel..  Rowman & Littlefield, 2013.

1910 plays
West End plays
Comedy plays
Plays by Stanley Houghton
Plays set in England